Ribbit King is a 2003 sports video game developed by Infinity and Jamsworks and published by Bandai for the Nintendo GameCube and PlayStation 2. The game is based on the fictional sport of Frolf (ケロフ), which is a golf-like game that is played with frogs. The frogs sit on catapults, which the player whacks with a hammer to send the frog flying into the air. It is the successor to Kero Kero King, released only in Japan in 2000 for the PlayStation.

Gameplay
The objective is to earn the most points possible by landing the frog in the course's hole in the quickest time possible. Players can also earn points by sending their frogs through various spheres scattered through the level. In addition, they can score points by having their frogs eaten by giant snakes, by having their frogs swim, or by any number of other things.

North American versions of Ribbit King come packaged with a bonus disc called Ribbit King Plus!, which is an assortment of 28 short CGI films about Scooter and his friends. These films are unlocked during the main game.

The main character of Ribbit King is a young carpenter named Scooter. Scooter is trying to become the Frolf Champion—or the namesake 'Ribbit King'—and in doing so win the 'Super Ribbinite', a fuel source his planet needs in order to survive. The game also includes such characters as a pile of rocks, a gumball machine, and a kung fu panda named Pan-Pan.

Characters

,  and 

 and

Ribbit King Plus!
Ribbit King Plus! is the bonus disc included with North American versions of the game, featuring unlockable short animations and requiring saved data on the memory card to be able to view the shorts. It was initially transmitted in Japan as a 30-episode series of shorts on the TV Tokyo weekday morning children's show Oha Suta from 16 June to 25 July 2003 to promote the game, under the title , before being released on a separate DVD at around the same time as the Japanese PlayStation 2 version of the game; however, three of the shorts were dropped from the North American version for unknown reasons. Exclusive to the disc is a two-minute video titled "Special", a montage of the various cutscenes from the story mode set to the main title theme of the game.

Episodes

Kero Kero King

 is the predecessor to Ribbit King, developed by Amedio and published by Media Factory. It was released exclusively in Japan on December 10th 2000 for the PlayStation. All of the unique art in the game and in the many FMVs featured inside the game are done by Japanese illustrator Yosuke Kihara.

The gameplay follows a very similar formula as its sequel Ribbit King as it is a golf based game but uses a frog instead of the ball, allowing you to tweak the direction and height of the frog while also collection points throughout the courses. The frog is also able to jump off spider webs and jump to flies adding variance to the gameplay especially in versus mode. The are a total of 10 courses in the game with each game taking 10 rounds to complete and the person with the highest score wins.

The story of Kero Kero King is summarized on its front cover as follows: ""Kerof" is the brand new exciting sports in the galaxy. The champion of the kerof is called "kerokeroking". But Nosukin, a little boy, is about to challenge him!!" The story also has Nosukin meeting many unique characters in games of kerof which you can unlock and use in versus mode.

Reception

The game received mixed reviews upon release. Aggregating review websites GameRankings and Metacritic gave the GameCube version 63.07% and 60/100 and the PlayStation 2 version 63.64% and 58/100. Former GameSpot journalist Ryan Davis gave the PlayStation 2 version 5.9 out of 10, saying that it focused more on the bizarre storyline than the gameplay, while Mary Jane Irwin of IGN gave the GameCube and the PlayStation 2 versions a score of five out of ten.

In Japan, Famitsu gave Kero Kero King a score of 30 out of 40.

References

External links
Ribbit King Official Website

2000 video games
2003 video games
Bandai games
Golf video games
Multiplayer and single-player video games
GameCube games
PlayStation (console) games
PlayStation 2 games
Video games about amphibians
Video games developed in Japan